Rai Bahadur (also Rao Bahadur in South India),  R.B., was a title of honour bestowed during British rule in India to individuals for faithful service or acts of public welfare to the Empire. From 1911, the title was accompanied by a medal called a Title Badge. Translated, Rao means "prince", and Bahadur means "brave" or "most honourable". Bestowed mainly on Hindus, the equivalent title for Muslim and Parsi subjects was Khan Bahadur. For Sikhs it was Sardar Bahadur.

Those awarded the Rao Bahadur title were usually drawn from the lower rank of Rai Sahib, both of which were below the rank of Dewan Bahadur. These titles were subordinate to the two orders of knighthood: the Order of the Indian Empire and the higher Order of the Star of India. A holder of a Rai Sahib, Rai Bahadur or Dewan Bahadur title came lower in the order of precedence.

Selected recipients awarded the Rao/Rai Bahadur title

Academics and education
 Pt. Sadashiva Jairam Dehadrai, Professor of Sanskrit, Jabalpur College.
 Priya Nath Dutt, assistant registrar, Punjab University
  S.N (Satya Nand) Mukarji Esq, BA (Cantab) and MA (Cantab), 6th - and longest-serving (1926-1945) - Principal of St. Stephen's College, Delhi (a foundation constituent college of Delhi University), Wrangler in the Mathematical Tripos from Queens' College, Cambridge. Member, Lindsay Commission;

Activists and politicians
 S. A. Saminatha Iyer, Indian independence activist.
 Manik Lal Joshi, chief minister of Bundi, Rajputana
Motilal Nehru, Indian independence activist, he later surrendered it during the non-co-operation movement of 1921.
Mahadev Govind Ranade, Indian scholar, social reformer, judge and author. He was one of the founding members of the Indian National Congress.
 Jaswant Raj Mehta Indian politician, elected to the Lok Sabha; elected to Jodhpur State Legislative Assembly in 1947
 C. Jambulingam Mudaliar (1857 - 1906), Indian politician and freedom-fighter
 Gopal Hari Deshmukh, Indian writer, activist, and thinker from Maharashtra popularly known as Lokhitwadi among the people.
 T. M. Jambulingam Mudaliar (1890 - 1970), philanthropist and freedom fighter who gave 620 acre land to establish NLC India Limited
 Kurma Venkata Reddy Naidu, Chief Minister of Madras Presidency.
 Seth Vishandas Nihalchand, Sindhi politician, social reformer, philanthropist
 Chhotu Ram, Minister for Agriculture and Home Affairs, erstwhile Punjab, 1945. First Indian-origin Speaker of the Punjab Legislative Assembly.

Civil servants and government officials
 Jagan Nath Bhandari Raj Ratan, Dewan of Idar State
 Lada Damodar Das, extrajudicial assistant commissioner in the Punjab
 Dewan Jaggatnath, secretary to the municipal committee and district board, Dera Ismail Khan
 Sahu Parsotam Saran Kothiwala, member of the district board, Moradabad
 Lala Jai Lal, member of the Municipal Committee, Simla
 A. Savarinatha Pillai, Assistant Commissioner of Income Tax, Madras Presidency; winner of King's Coronation Award for Distinguished Public Service, London
 Akshey Kumar Sarkar, superintendent, Department of Commerce and Industry, Government of India
 Betharam Sarma, sub-deputy collector, Tezpur, Assam

Commerce and industry
 Jamnalal Bajaj, industrialist (he later returned the title)
 Dewan Bahadur P. Somasundaram Chettiar, Coimbatore - industrialist and pioneer in textiles. 
 Jagmal Raja Chauhan, industrialist and noted railway contractor
 Jairam Valji Chauhan, industrialist and noted railway contractor
 Seth Sarupchand Hukamchand,(1874–1959) merchant, Indore, thara of Indian industry and a prominent leader of the Jain community 
 Gujar Mal Modi, founder of the Modi Group
 Mohan Singh Oberoi, founder of Oberoi Group
 Jamuna Das Choudhury, industrialist, Sahibganj 
 Hariram Goenka - scion of Goenka Group from Kolkata.
 Badridas Goenka - scion of Goenka Group from Kolkata

Engineering, science and medicine
 Kailash Chandra Bose,  first knighted Indian physician.
 Upendranath Brahmachari, Bengal Presidency, Discovery of urea stibamine for the treatment of Kala Azar
 Balkishen Kaul, surgeon, lecturer, and superintendent of Lahore Medical college
 Puttana Venkatramana Raju (1894-1975), civil engineer, industrial advisor to government of India, educationist.
 Ram Dhan Singh (Dr.),  pioneer agricultural scientist, principal, College of Agriculture, Lyallpur, erstwhile Punjab, 1947.

Law and justice
 Babu Ram Sadan Bhattacharji, deputy magistrate, Bengal
 Chaudhary Dewan Chand Saini , (1887-?) of Gurdaspur, Punjab, distinguished lawyer of Punjab High Court, leader of the criminal bar; elected member of Legislative Council of colonial Punjab
 Rajendranath Dutt, judge, Bengal
 Soti Raghubans Lal, subordinate judge, Shahjehanpur
 Sadh Achraj Lal, honorary magistrate and member of the municipal board, Mirzapur
 Jwala Prasad, government pleader
 Raghunath Sharan, District Judge in Bihar
 Babu Bahadur Singh, honorary magistrate, Pilibhit 
 Babu Shuhrat Singh, Zemindar of Chandpur and honorary magistrate, Basti
 N S Nanjundiah (1879-1953), of Nanjangud distinguished advocate of Chief Court of Mysore and a sheristadar.

Literature and arts
 Appu Nedungadi,  author of Kundalatha, the first novel published in Malayalam
 M.V. Dhurandhar,  noted painter and postcard artist who was an alumni & later professor at Sir J.J. School of Art, Mumbai.

Philanthropy, religion and charity
 Ranchhodlal Chhotalal, textile mill pioneer and philanthropist
Dharmarathnakara Arcot Narrainsawmy Mudaliar, philanthropist.
 Amba Prasad, philanthropist of Delhi
 Salig Rām (Rai Saligram)), (1829-1898) Postmaster-General, North-Western Provinces, disciple of Shiv Dayal Singh, later succeeding him as guru.
 Ranadaprasad Saha, philanthropist
 Yele Mallappa Shetty, philanthropist, 1887, constructed Bangalore's first obstetrics hospital, funded Vani Vilas Hospital construction, restored Kaadu Malleshwara Temple, Bangalore
 Sardar Bahadur Jagat Singh (Sant) (1884-1951), Lyallpur, pre-partition Punjab Surat Shabd Yoga practitioner and guru 
 Gubbi Thotadappa, businessman, philanthropist, founded Dharmachathra (free lodging places for travellers) and free hostels for students throughout Karnataka.
Chaudhary Amar Singh,Jagirdar Pali,Dist Bulandshahr.Philanthropist.Established KEM Jat High School at Lahkaoti,which later became Amar Singh Degree College. (Award of Rai Bahadur published in New Year Honours List in the Indian Gazette of 01 Jan 1915.)

Police and emergency services
 Tirath Singh Bakshi, Deputy Inspector General of Police, United Province
 Purna Chandra Lahiri, Indian Police officer, Calcutta
 P. K. Monnappa, South Indian Police Chief of three states, Madras, Hyderabad and Mysore.
 Jacob Devasahayam, Deputy Inspector General of Police, Madras 
 Satyen Nath (S.N.) Mukherjee, First Indian-origin Deputy Commissioner of Indian Police, Calcutta.

Other

 Babu Nalini Kanta Ray, Dastidar of Assam

See also
 Rai (Indian)
 Nawab Bahadur (disambiguation)
 Raj Ratna

References

Titles in India
Titles in Bangladesh
Orders, decorations, and medals of British India
Men's social titles
Awards disestablished in 1947